Bulgarians are a recognized minority in Romania (Rumaniya), numbering 7,336 according to the 2011 Romanian census, down from 8,025 in 2002. Despite their low census number today, Bulgarians from different confessional and regional backgrounds have had ethnic communities in various regions of Romania, and during the Middle Ages Bulgarian culture has exerted considerable influence on its northern neighbour. According to one Bulgarian estimate, Romanian citizens of Bulgarian origin number around 250,000. According to the Romanian census of 2021, among the 5,975 ethnic Bulgarians, 3,583 were Roman Catholics, 1,977 were Romanian Orthodox and 21 were Serbian Orthodox.

Historically, Bulgarian communities in modern Romania have existed in Wallachia (transliterated: Vlashko), Northern Dobruja (translit. Severna Dobrudzha) and Transylvania (translit. Sedmigradsko). Currently, however, the Bulgarian community in present-day Romania that has retained most efficiently its numbers, social integrity and strong ethnic identity is that of the Banat Bulgarians, a Roman Catholic minority in the Banat who account for the bulk of the Bulgarian-identifying population of Romania. In Wallachia, there are only few Bulgarians who have preserved their national identity, though the numbers of those who speak Bulgarian and affirm to have Bulgarian ancestors is still high.

Much of the Torlak-speaking Roman Catholic Krashovani who today form a part of the Croatian minority in Romania had declared themselves Bulgarian during the rule Austria-Hungary.

The population of undisputed Bulgarian origin aside, Bulgarian researchers also claim that the Hungarian minority of the Székely in central Romania is of Magyarized Bulgar (Proto-Bulgarian) origin and the Șchei of Transylvania were Romanianized Bulgarians (a view also supported by Lyubomir Miletich and accepted by Romanian writers).

Names
While the modern Romanian word for Bulgarians is "bulgari", throughout the history they have been known by other names.

The old Bulgarian population—which existed in Romania by the time of the founding of the principality of Wallachia and the inclusion of Transylvania in the Hungarian Kingdom—was referred as Șchei. This word, currently obsolete, derives from the Latin word sclavis, referring to all South Slavs. Currently, the word appears in many place names in Wallachia and Transylvania, among which, Șcheii Brașovului, a neighborhood of Braşov.

The Bulgarians who migrated during the 19th century were known as sârbi (Serbians). This word may have been used by Romanians to refer to all South Slavs, but it has also been proposed that they used this ethnic identification to prevent the Ottomans from demanding the Wallachian authorities to return the refugees to their place of origin. Even today, the Bulgarians from Wallachia are called "sârbi" (=Serbians) though they speak Bulgarian and define themselves as "bulgari" (=Bulgarians).

History

Antiquity and medieval Bulgarian Empire
In Antiquity, both Bulgaria and Romania were inhabited by Thracian tribes, contributing to the ethnogenesis of the Romanian people and possibly the Bulgarian people (along with Slavs and Bulgars), although this is a matter of dispute. During the Migration Period, both the Slavs and the Bulgars crossed what is today Romania to settle in the plains south of the Danube, establishing the First Bulgarian Empire in the 7th century. In the Middle Ages, the lands between the Danube and the Carpathians were scarcely settled, but they were often at least nominally under Bulgarian control in the 9th and 10th century, as well as during some periods of the Second Bulgarian Empire.

The Golden Age of Bulgarian culture under Simeon I exerted considerable influence on the empire's transdanubian possessions. Old Bulgarian was established as the language of liturgy and written communication along with the Cyrillic script created in Bulgaria, which was used for the Romanian language until the 1860s; the first written text in the Romanian language, Neacşu's letter of 1512, illustrates this trend: it was written in Cyrillic, intermixed with Bulgarian sentences and phrases. To this day, a notable part of Romanian's core vocabulary is of Latinized South Slavic origin, although much of it was replaced by Romance and Classical Latin loanwords in the 19th century.

Under the Ottomans
As the Second Bulgarian Empire fell under full-scale Ottoman rule in the 14th-15th century whereas the lands north of the Danube were still contested between the Europeans and the Ottomans and then came under Ottoman suzerainty, but retained their internal autonomy, many Bulgarian fled the Ottoman occupation in various periods and settled in what is today Romania. These included both Bulgarian Orthodox and some Roman Catholics (either former Paulicians from the central Bulgarian north or from Chiprovtsi in the northwest). The migratory waves were particularly strong after the Austro-Turkish and Russo-Turkish Wars of the 17th-19th century. The Orthodox Bulgarians settled all around the Principality of Wallachia; however, many of them gradually lost their Bulgarian identity and became Romanianized. Catholics primarily migrated to the Austrian-ruled Banat and Transylvania, establishing still-extant communities in modern Timiș County and Arad County; some former Paulicians also settled around Bucharest, in Cioplea and Popeşti-Leordeni. The Transylvanian city of Braşov (Kronstadt) grew into an international merchant centre attracting Bulgarian merchants ever since the 14th century (it was given trade rights in Bulgaria by Bulgarian tsar Ivan Sratsimir's Braşov Charter of 1369–1380) and rivalled Constantinople and Thessaloniki in importance, particularly for the people from northern Bulgaria, with many Bulgarian merchants opening offices and shops in the city. As early as 1392, Bulgarian settlers arrived in the city, contributing to the construction of the city church, today known as the Black Church, and populating the once-Bulgarian city neighbourhood of Șcheii Brașovului. After the Greek Civil War, thousands of Greeks and ethnic Bulgarians fled Greece. Many were evacuated to Romania. A large evacuation camp was established in the Romanian town of Tulgheș.

In the mid-19th century the cities of southern Romania such as Bucharest, Craiova, Galaţi and Brăila attracted many Bulgarian revolutionary and political émigrés, such as Sophronius of Vratsa, Petar Beron, Hristo Botev, Lyuben Karavelov, Georgi Rakovski, Panayot Hitov, Evlogi Georgiev and Hristo Georgievi. In his 1883 novelette Nemili-Nedragi ("Unloved and Unwanted"), Bulgarian national writer Ivan Vazov (1850–1921) describes the life of poor and nostalgic Bulgarian revolutionaries in Wallachia known as hashove (хъшове). Romania also turned into a centre for the organized Bulgarian revolutionary movement seeking to overthrow Ottoman rule: the Bulgarian Revolutionary Central Committee was founded in Bucharest in 1869. In the same year, the Bulgarian Literary Society (modern Bulgarian Academy of Sciences) was established in Brăila. Some of the Bessarabian Bulgarians were also ruled by Moldavia/Romania between 1856 and 1878 (during this time, in Bolgrad the first Bulgarian gymnasium has been opened: the Bolhrad High School), and all of them were under Romanian rule between 1918 and 1940. Today, they live in Ukraine and Moldova.

According to one estimate, the Bulgarian-originating population of the Romanian Old Kingdom and Transylvania (not including Bessarabia) by the time of the Liberation of Bulgaria in 1878 may have numbered up to one million. According to official data from 1838, 11,652 Bulgarian families lived in Wallachia, meaning up to 100,000 people.

After the Liberation of Bulgaria
Following the Liberation, members of all Bulgarian communities moved to the newly established Principality of Bulgaria, but a significant Bulgarian population remained in Romania. Although set to be ceded to Bulgarian as per the Treaty of San Stefano, the region of Northern Dobruja was awarded to Romania by the Congress of Berlin of 1878. The region had a compact Bulgarian population in the Babadag region, with Northern Dobruja Bulgarians numbering 35–45,000 in the late 19th century. Romania also ruled the Bulgarian-majority Southern Dobruja between 1913 and 1940, when it was ceded back to Bulgaria, with a population exchange between the Bulgarians of Northern Dobruja and the Romanian, Aromanian and Megleno-Romanian colonists in Southern Dobruja. Today, as an officially recognized ethnic minority, Bulgarians have one seat reserved in the Romanian Chamber of Deputies. There exist several organizations of the Bulgarians in Romania.

Towns and communes with the largest Bulgarian population percentage
Timiș County
Dudeștii Vechi (Banat Bulgarian: Stár Bišnov) — 61.1%
Denta — 16.06%
Sânnicolau Mare (Banat Bulgarian: Smikluš) — 2.98%
Deta — 1.93%
Arad County
Vinga — 5.41%

Notable figures
 This list includes people of Bulgarian origin born in what is today Romania or people born in Bulgaria but mainly active in Romania.
 Vasile Lupu (1595–1661) — ruler of the Principality of Moldavia (born in Arbanasi, of likely Albanian ancestry)
 Manuc Bei (1769–1817) — Bulgarian Armenian merchant, diplomat and innkeeper
 Stefan Bogoridi (1775/1780–1859) — ruler of the Principality of Moldavia
 Anton Pann (1790s–1854) — composer, musicologist, poet and author of the music to the Romanian anthem (born in Sliven, of disputed ancestry)
 Colonel Stefan Dunjov (1815–1889) — revolutionary, participant in the Hungarian Revolution of 1848 and member of Giuseppe Garibaldi's forces during the Italian unification
 Nicolae Vogoride (1820–1863) — ruler of the Principality of Moldavia
 Eusebius Fermendžin (1845–1897) — historian, high-ranking Franciscan cleric, theologian, polyglot and active member of the Yugoslav Academy of Sciences and Arts
 Carol Telbisz (1853–1914) — long-time mayor of Timișoara (1885–1914)
 Paraskev Stoyanov (1871–1941) —  surgeon, anarchist, historian and professor
 Christian Rakovsky (1873–1941) — communist revolutionary and diplomat
 Panait Cerna (1881–1913) — poet and translator
 Iorgu Iordan (1888–1986) — linguist, philologist and politician
 Boris Stefanov (1893–?) — communist politician and general secretary of the Romanian Communist Party
 Petre Borilă (1906–1973) — communist politician and vice-premier of Romania
 Dumitru Coliu (1907–1979) — communist politician

Gallery

See also
 Banat Bulgarians
 Bessarabian Bulgarians
 Dobrujan Bulgarians
 Șchei, Șcheii Brașovului
 Minorities of Romania
 Bulgarians in Hungary
 Bulgarians in Serbia
 Romanians in Bulgaria

References

Notes

Sources

External links 
 The website of Banat Bulgarian publications Náša glás and Literaturna miselj, offers PDF versions of both publications, as well as information about the Banat Bulgarians (in Banat Bulgarian)
 The webpage of the historically Bulgarian Roman Catholic parish in Cioplea, Bucharest (in Romanian)
 The webpage of the historically Bulgarian Roman Catholic parish in Popeşti-Leordeni (in Romanian)

 
 
Romania
Ethnic groups in Romania
Romania